Gravitarmata is a genus of moths belonging to the subfamily Olethreutinae of the family Tortricidae.

Species
Gravitarmata margarotana (Heinemann, 1863)

See also
List of Tortricidae genera

References

External links
tortricidae.com

Eucosmini
Tortricidae genera